Romieu or Romieux may refer to 

 Benjamin Romieux (1914–1988), a Swiss journalist 
 Benjamin Romieux, a sixteenth-century French poet
 a Quebec township named Romieu
 the grape more commonly known as malbec
 the commune of La Romieu in south-west France